Julie Helene Becker (born November 10, 1974) is an associate judge of the Superior Court of the District of Columbia and an attorney.

Early life 
Becker was born in Detroit, Michigan. Becker's father is Allan Becker and her mother is Patricia Becker.

Education 
In 1996, Becker earned her Bachelor of Arts degree in History from University of Michigan. In 1999, Becker earned her Juris Doctor from Yale Law School.

Career 
In 1999, Becker became a law clerk for then United States Court of Appeals for the Second Circuit Judge Sonia Sotomayor.

In 2000, Becker was chosen as a Skadden Fellow for a two year program. The fellowship was sponsored by Skadder, Arps, Slate, Meagher & Flom LLP of New York. Becker's project centered on housing law in Washington, DC. In 2000, Becker began her legal career at the Legal Aid Society of the District of Columbia. As a senior staff attorney and later supervising attorney, Becker practiced housing laws. Becker represented hundreds of low-income tenants and tenant associations in their efforts to obtain, improve, and preserve affordable housing.

D.C. superior court 
On April 15, 2015, President Barack Obama nominated Becker to a 15-year term as an associate judge of the Superior Court of the District of Columbia to fill the vacancy created by the retirement of Judge Herbert B. Dixon Jr. On March 2, 2016, the Senate Committee on Homeland Security and Governmental Affairs held a hearing on her nomination. The Senate confirmed her nomination on June 23, 2016, by voice vote.

Awards and recognitions 
 2000 Skadden Fellow. Selected by Skadden, Arps, Slate, Meagher & Flom LLP of New York.
 2006 National Housing Law Project's Housing Justice Award.
 2009 D.C.'s Rising Star 40 Under 40. National Law Journal.

Personal life 
Becker's husband is Alan Silverleib. They have two daughters.

References

External links 
 Becker, Julie at dccourts.gov
 The Judge is (Still) Not In at dcbar.org (January 2016)
 Rachel Marshall at campaignforyouthjustice.org (Becker's law clerk)
 Julie Becker's endorsement letter at hbadc.org (February 12, 2015)

1974 births
Living people
20th-century American women lawyers
20th-century American lawyers
21st-century American judges
21st-century American women judges
Judges of the Superior Court of the District of Columbia
Lawyers from Detroit
Lawyers from Washington, D.C.
University of Michigan alumni
Yale Law School alumni